Nicolás "Nico" Alberto Fernández (born 17 November 1986), sometimes known as just Nico, is an Argentine footballer who plays for Malaysian club Johor Darul Ta'zim II as an attacking midfielder.

Club career
Fernández was born in Temperley, Buenos Aires, but for family reasons at age of 12 he moved to Mar del Plata.  Thanks to his good performance with Lanús , Deportivo Norte and Olimpo youth teams, he attracts the attention of FIFA agent Alejandro Camano with strong ties with Spanish clubs, who brought him to RCD Mallorca, where those years, a lot of Argentinian playing for the first team like Guillermo Pereyra, Jonas Gutierrez, Ariel Ibagaza and Germán Lux.

Fernández met for the first time what is living in another country.  He played in a club with an infrastructure of top clubs in Argentina and the economic instability in his country made him doubt about his remaining in Argentina. In 2011, he signed to Lorca Atlético CF, a small town only 40 minutes from Murcia. After a year there, he signed for La Hoya Lorca CF.

After the impressive 2013-14 season, the first for La Hoya Lorca in Segunda División B, the bitter moment to restructure the squad arrives, as Fernandez one of the most prominent and beloved by fans, has decided to move to Greece, playing for Asteras Tripoli. Fernandez was the first to be announced after the rise of the club in Segunda División B, and this season has played 37 matches between league and playoffs, but only 27 of them have appeared in the starting lineup, scoring 6 goals.

On 1 July 2014, Fernández signed a three years' contract with Greek Super League side Asteras Tripoli. After 2,5 years with the club, they accepted the offer of the Malaysia Premier League club Johor Darul Ta'zim II F.C. He left the club having 64 appearances (9 goals, 7 assists) in all competitions.

References

External links

1986 births
Living people
Argentine footballers
Association football midfielders
Segunda División B players
Tercera División players
RCD Mallorca B players
Lorca FC players
Super League Greece players
Asteras Tripolis F.C. players
Johor Darul Ta'zim II F.C. players
Argentine expatriate footballers
Argentine expatriate sportspeople in Spain
Argentine expatriate sportspeople in Greece
Argentine expatriate sportspeople in Malaysia
Expatriate footballers in Spain
Expatriate footballers in Greece
Expatriate footballers in Malaysia
Lorca Atlético CF players
Sportspeople from Mar del Plata